The Kreuz Hegau (German:Autobahnkreuz Hegau, Abbreviation: AK Hegau) is a Directional T interchange/Half-Cloverleaf interchange in the German state of Baden-Württemberg.

The interchange connects the A98 coming from Stockach and the  B33 coming from Konstanz to the A81 Stuttgart–Gottmadingen.

Geography 
The interchange lies in the region Hegau in Singen in the Landkreis Konstanz. It lies in the triangle Stuttgart-Konstanz-Schaffhausen.

History 
According to the original plans, the Kreuz Hegau would form the crossing between the A 98 Basel-Schaffhausen-Singen-Lindau (aka Voralpenautobahn) and the A 81 Stuttgart-Singen-Konstanz. This did not happen, and the Bodenseeautobahn A 98 towards Lindau was only built to Stockach.

The part of the A 98 from the interchange towards Schaffhausen was, on request of the CDU in 1977 in the government of Baden-Württemberg renamed to A 81. The parts of the A 81 towards Konstanz that were being built, were first renamed to A881, and later to B 33.  The A 98 planned and built towards Stockach is still in use.

In the early 1990s, the Autobahnkreuz Singen, as they named it after completion, was renamed to Autobahnkreuz Hegau.  Construction for Autobahnkreuz Singen began in Autumn 1977.

Due to its unusual building form with a main north/southwest relation, the interchange has the only left hand junction in mainland Europe, the junction from direction Stuttgart for the B33 to Konstanz.

Traffic near the interchange

References 

Hegau